Yedikuyular Ski Resort is a ski resort in Turkey near the city of Kahramanmaraş. It is situated at  elevation.

Overview
Yedikuyular Ski Resort is located on Mount Ahır at Ulutaş neighborhood in Dulkadiroğlu district of Kahramanmaraş Province in southern Turkey.

The ski resort was established by the Kahramanmaraş Metropolitan Municipality in 2018. It was later sold to a private sector company, which runs it.

The site takes its name from "Yedikuyular" (literally: "Seven wells"), where some wells are still existing today.

Facilities

There three marked pistes:

Further facilities are ski junping ramps, picnic and recreation areas, a pond, basketball and volleyball courts, off-road and trekking areas, a heliport, a 1,000 car capacity parking lot.

The ski resort is visited on weekends by 15,000-20,000 tourist.

International winter sports events hosted
The ski resort hosted one event of the CEV Snow Volleyball European Tour in 2022.

References

External links
Official website

Ski areas and resorts in Turkey
Buildings and structures in Kahramanmaraş Province
Tourist attractions in Kahramanmaraş Province
Sports venues completed in 2018
2018 establishments in Turkey